The 1979 Cupa României Final was the 41st final of Romania's most prestigious football cup competition. It was disputed between Steaua București and Sportul Studențesc București, and was won by Steaua București after a game with 3 goals. It was the 13th cup for Steaua București.

Match details

See also
List of Cupa României finals

References

External links
Romaniansoccer.ro

1976
Cupa
Romania
FC Steaua București matches